Le Chiffre ("The Cypher" or "The Digit") is a fictional character and the main antagonist of Ian Fleming's 1953  novel, Casino Royale. On screen Le Chiffre has been portrayed by Peter Lorre in the 1954 television adaptation of the novel for CBS's Climax! anthology television series, by Orson Welles in the 1967 spoof of the novel and Bond film series, and by Mads Mikkelsen in the 2006 film version of Fleming's novel where he is one of two main antagonists, the other being Mr. White.

Fleming based the character on occultist Aleister Crowley.

Novel biography
Le Chiffre, alias "Die Nummer", "Mr. Number", "Herr Ziffer" and other translations of "The Number", "The Numeral", "The Figure", "The Cipher", or "The Code" in various languages, is the paymaster of the "Syndicat des Ouvriers d'Alsace" (French for "Alsatian Workmen's Union"), a SMERSH-controlled trade union.

He is first encountered as an inmate of the Dachau displaced persons camp in the US zone of Allied-occupied Germany in June 1945, where he displayed (possibly simulated) mutism and amnesia. He gained back speech capability and was transferred to Alsace-Lorraine and Strasbourg (due to some mention he made of them) three months later on a stateless passport. There he adopts the name Le Chiffre because as he claims, he is "only a number on a passport". Not much else is really known about Le Chiffre's background or where he comes from, except for educated guesses based on his description:

In the novel, he serves as the paymaster for the Syndicat des Ouvriers d'Alsace, an important Communist trade union in Alsace. MI6 also believes the union would serve as a fifth column in the event of a Third World War between NATO and the Eastern Bloc, capable to mobilizing its 50,000 members to seize control of a substantial portion of the French–West German borderlands. He makes a major investment in the Cordon Jaune string of brothels with 50 million francs in subsidies belonging to SMERSH. The investment fails after the Loi Marthe Richard is signed into law banning prostitution in France. Le Chiffre then goes to the casino Royale-les-Eaux with the union's remaining 25 million francs in funds in an attempt to replace his lost money before the Soviet government notices. Le Chiffre is suggested to be a genuinely committed Communist, with his MI6 dossier inferring that he probably only invested in the brothels because he believed it would increase his union's funds. 

MI6 sends Bond, an expert baccarat player, to the casino to bankrupt Le Chiffre and force him to take refuge with the British government and inform on SMERSH. Bond bests Le Chiffre in a game of Chemin de Fer, taking all of his money. Le Chiffre kidnaps Bond's love interest, Vesper Lynd, to lure Bond into a trap and get back his money. The trap works, and Le Chiffre tortures Bond by beating his genitals with a carpet-beater to get him to give up the money. He is interrupted by a SMERSH agent, however, who shoots him between the eyes with a silenced TT pistol as punishment for losing the money.

The French press reports that Le Chiffre committed suicide, throwing the French Communist Party into disarray after Maurice Thorez's stroke. Le Chiffre's union is also bankrupted. These events are seen by the Soviet Union as an embarrassment, which in addition to the death and defeat of Mr. Big in Live and Let Die, leads to the events of From Russia, with Love.

Novel henchmen
 Basil – bodyguard and martial arts expert who takes pleasure in roughing up Bond. He is later killed by a SMERSH agent.
 Kratt – Le Chiffre's Corsican bodyguard who wields a walking-stick gun with which he threatens to cripple Bond at the gaming table. He is later killed by a SMERSH agent.

1967 film biography

Le Chiffre is a secondary villain in the 1967 satire and appears in one of the few segments of the film actually adapted from Fleming's book. As in the novel, Le Chiffre is charged with recovering a large sum of money for SMERSH after he loses it at the baccarat table. He first attempts to raise the funds by holding an auction of embarrassing photographs of military and political leaders from China, the United States, and the Soviet Union, but this is foiled by Sir James Bond's daughter, Mata Bond. With no other option, he returns to the baccarat table to try to win back the money. Later, he encounters baccarat Master Evelyn Tremble, who has been recruited by Bond to stop Le Chiffre from raising the money. Le Chiffre attempts to distract Tremble by performing elaborate magic tricks, but fails to prevent Tremble from winning. Afterwards, he arranges for Tremble to be kidnapped and subjects the agent to psychedelic torture in order to get back the money. The torture session is interrupted when his SMERSH masters, led by the film's main villain, Dr. Noah, shoot him dead.

2006 film biography
In the 2006 film adaptation of Casino Royale, Le Chiffre is portrayed by Danish actor Mads Mikkelsen. Believed by MI6 to be Albanian and officially stateless, Le Chiffre is a private banker who finances international terrorism. M implies that Le Chiffre conspired with al-Qaeda in orchestrating the September 11 attacks, or at least deliberately profiteered from the attacks by short selling large quantities of airline stocks beforehand. In the video game version of Quantum of Solace, it is said that his birth name is "Jean Duran", in the MI6 mission briefings. A mathematical genius and a chess prodigy, his abilities enable him to earn large sums of money on games of chance and probabilities, and he likes to show off by playing poker. He suffers from haemolacria, which causes him to weep blood out of a damaged vessel in his left eye. As in Fleming's novel, he dresses in immaculate black suits and uses a Salbutamol inhaler, here plated with platinum. Unlike in the novel Le Chiffre has no ideological motivations, saying that his driving belief is in a "reasonable rate of return." 

At the start of the movie, Le Chiffre is contacted by Mr. White, a representative of an elite criminal organisation later revealed to be Quantum (and, later still, Spectre). White introduces Steven Obanno, a leader of the Lord's Resistance Army in Uganda, to Le Chiffre, and arranges to launder several briefcases of money for Obanno. Le Chiffre invests the money along with his other creditors' funds into the aircraft manufacturer SkyFleet. Though SkyFleet's shares have been skyrocketing in wake of a new aircraft they are rolling out, Le Chiffre plans to short the company by purchasing put options, and ordering the destruction of the company's new prototype airliner, set to make its first flight out of Miami International Airport. Bond intervenes and foils the plan by killing Le Chiffre's first contractor for the job, as well as the backup contractor Le Chiffre hires to take his place.

The failure of his airline scheme causes Le Chiffre to lose over $100 million. He sets up and enters a high-stakes Texas hold 'em tournament at Casino Royale in Montenegro in an attempt to recoup his losses before his clients find out that their money has been misappropriated and seek revenge against him. Bond is sent to make sure that Le Chiffre does not win back the money, hoping to force him to turn to MI6 for asylum in exchange for information on his creditors and employers. An accountant from HM Treasury, Vesper Lynd, is sent to accompany Bond to make sure the money is used properly.

During the tournament, an irate Obanno and his lieutenant break into Le Chiffre's hotel room, restrain his girlfriend Valenka, and strangle him with a cord. Le Chiffre asks for, and is granted one last chance to win their money back. He offers not one word of objection to Obanno's feigned amputation of Valenka's arm, leading the ruthless warlord to advise her to find a new partner. As Obanno leaves the room, his bodyguard spots Bond and Vesper in the hallway, and hears Valenka's cries coming from Bond's earpiece. Bond kills the bodyguard by throwing him over a railing, then chokes Obanno to death with Vesper's assistance after relieving Obanno of his machete. Rene Mathis arranges the blame to be placed on Le Chiffre's bodyguard Leo by planting the bodies in the trunk of Leo's car.

On the second day of the tournament, Le Chiffre initially outwits and bankrupts Bond, who cannot get additional funding approved by Vesper. However, Felix Leiter, a Central Intelligence Agency agent sent to participate in the game, also in hopes of bankrupting Le Chiffre, agrees to bankroll Bond, on the condition that CIA is allowed to take Le Chiffre in afterwards. Desperate, Le Chiffre has Valenka spike Bond's drink. Bond almost dies, but, thanks to an antitoxin kit in his car, a defibrillator, and Vesper's timely assistance, he is revived at the last moment and returns to the game. During the final round, Le Chiffre's full house bests the hands of the two players preceding him, but loses to Bond's straight flush.

Le Chiffre kidnaps Vesper, forcing Bond to give chase, and leads him straight into a trap. Le Chiffre leaves Vesper, bound at the feet and hands, in the middle of the road, and Bond is forced to swerve to avoid hitting her and crashes his car.

Semiconscious, Bond is stripped naked and bound to a chair with the seat removed. Le Chiffre proceeds to whip Bond in the testicles repeatedly with the knotted end of a ship's lanyard, each time demanding the password for the account into which the tournament winnings will be transferred. Bond refuses to give in, telling him that no matter what torture he is subjected to, he will not give up the password and that Le Chiffre's clients will find and kill him. The spy also asserts that if the banker takes his life, no hiding place will be safe. Le Chiffre counters that the information he can give to MI6 will be enough for them to grant him sanctuary even if he does kill Bond and Vesper. When Bond continues to defy him, Le Chiffre brandishes a knife and prepares to castrate him, only to be interrupted by the sound of gunfire outside. Mr. White enters the room with a pistol in hand, having just killed Valenka and Kratt; Le Chiffre pleads for his life and promises to recover the lost funds, but White denounces him as untrustworthy and shoots him in the head. To date, he is the only main Bond villain to die before the film's final act.

Le Chiffre is mentioned in the direct sequel, Quantum of Solace and is also seen in a background image inside MI6.

In Spectre, it is revealed that Le Chiffre - along with Dominic Greene, the main antagonist of Quantum of Solace, and Raoul Silva, the main antagonist of Skyfall - was an agent of the titular criminal organization and its leader, Ernst Stavro Blofeld.

Appearances

Eon films 
 Casino Royale (2006)
 Quantum of Solace (2008) – mentioned/seen in a photograph only
 Spectre (2015) – mentioned/seen in archive footage and a photograph only

Non-Eon productions 
 "Casino Royale" (a CBS television adaptation for the TV series Climax!, 1954)
 Casino Royale (a Columbia Pictures release, 1967)

2006 film henchmen

 Alex Dimitrios – stabbed by Bond with his own knife
 Carlos Nikolic – accidentally blew himself up, courtesy of Bond
 Mollaka – shot by Bond
 Leo – arrested
 Bobbie
 Jochum
 Kratt – shot by Mr. White
 Valenka – shot by Mr. White
 General Grafin von Wallenstein
 Madame Wu
 Sheriff Tomelli
 Lionel
 Ison

See also
 Casino Royale (novel)
 Casino Royale (1954 film)
 Casino Royale (1967 film)
 Casino Royale (2006 film)

Notes

Bond villains
Fictional gamblers
Fictional mathematicians
Fictional murderers
Fictional torturers
Fictional Albanian people
Fictional French people
Casino Royale (novel)
Literary characters introduced in 1953
Fictional characters based on real people
Characters in British novels of the 20th century
Fictional bankers
Male literary villains
Male film villains
Action film villains
Fictional murdered people
Film supervillains
Fictional characters with amnesia
Fictional communists